Docking railway station was a station in Norfolk, serving the village of Docking. It closed to passengers in 1952.

References

Disused railway stations in Norfolk
Former Great Eastern Railway stations
Railway stations in Great Britain opened in 1866
Railway stations in Great Britain closed in 1952
Docking, Norfolk